The 1961 All-Atlantic Coast Conference football team consists of American football players chosen by various selectors for their All-Atlantic Coast Conference ("ACC") teams for the 1961 NCAA University Division football season. Selectors in 1961 included the Associated Press (AP).

All-Atlantic Coast selections

Ends
 Gary Collins, Maryland (AP-1, UPI-1, ACSWA-1)
 Johnny Morris, NC State (UPI-1, ACSWA-1)
 Tommy King, Clemson (AP-1)

Tackles
 Art Gregory, Duke (AP-1, UPI-1, ACSWA-1)
 Jim Moss, South Carolina (AP-1, UPI-1, ACSwA-1)

Guards
 Jean Berry, Duke (AP-1, UPI-1, ACSWA-1)
 Jim LeCompte, North Carolina (AP-1, UPI-1, ACSWA-1)

Centers
 Bob Hacker, Maryland (AP-1, ACSWA-1)
 Ron Andreo, Clemson (UPI-1)

Backs
 Roman Gabriel, North Carolina State (AP-1 [quarterback], UPI-1 [quarterback], ACSWA-1)
 Bob Elliott, North Carolina (AP-1 [fullback], UPI-1 ACSWA-1)
 Alan White, Wake Forest (AP-1 [halfback], ACSWA-1)
 Gib Carson, North Carolina (AP-1 [halfback])
 Mark Leggett, Duke (UPI-1)
 Billy Gambrell, South Carolina (ACSWA-1)

Key

See also
1961 College Football All-America Team

References

All-Atlantic Coast Conference football team
All-Atlantic Coast Conference football teams